North Fork Township is a township in Delaware County, Iowa, USA.  As of the 2000 census, its population was 512.

Geography
North Fork Township covers an area of 36.3 square miles (94.02 square kilometers); of this, 0.05 square miles (0.13 square kilometers) or 0.14 percent is water. The streams of Cooksley Creek, Durion Creek, Penn Creek and Silver Creek run through this township.

Unincorporated towns
 Gilt Edge
(This list is based on USGS data and may include former settlements.)

Extinct towns
 Rockville

Adjacent townships
 Bremen Township (north)
 New Wine Township, Dubuque County (northeast)
 Dodge Township, Dubuque County (east)
 Cascade Township, Dubuque County (southeast)
 South Fork Township (south)
 Delhi Township (west)

Cemeteries
The township contains one cemetery, Rockville.

Major highways
 U.S. Route 20

References
 U.S. Board on Geographic Names (GNIS)
 United States Census Bureau cartographic boundary files

External links
 US-Counties.com
 City-Data.com

Townships in Delaware County, Iowa
Townships in Iowa